Ronald Ransom (January 21, 1882 – December 2, 1947) was an American lawyer and businessman who served as the 6th vice chairman of the Federal Reserve from 1936 until his death in 1947.

References

1882 births
1947 deaths
Franklin D. Roosevelt administration personnel
Truman administration personnel
Vice Chairs of the Federal Reserve